Fishers Island Union Free School District is a school district headquartered in Fishers Island, New York. It consists of a single K-12 school, Fishers Island School.

It functions as a magnet school for out of state students.

History
The school population declined by about 50 when the U.S. Army closed its base on Fishers Island. The depopulation meant that some grade levels were not taught at times as zero students existed for those grades. The current facility opened in 1974. In 1997 area residents continued to call it "the new school" even though it was built in the 1970s. It began admitting out of state students in 1987.

Campuses
In 1997 the school had an IBM compatible computer lab and an Apple Macintosh computer lab. Verde referred to that as something typical of a private school.

Operations
 taxation provides most of the school's revenues, with additional money from tuition.

Admissions
It allows people living in mainland Connecticut and Rhode Island to send their children to the school.

In 1997 annual tuition was $1,750. In 2012 it charged $3,400 each year per out off state student. A parent of a student would additionally pay $1,500 each year for tickets for the ferry. By 2019 annual tuition was about $5,000. Residents of New York State (that is residents of Fishers Island) attend for free.

The school aims to have class sizes up to ten, so therefore according to Candice Rudd of Newsday admissions have become "competitive".

Curriculum
In 1997 the school had art and music classes that, by that year, had been cut by several schools on the mainland. The taxation revenue allows the school to have these courses.

Student body
Students who attend include those from, in addition to Fishers Island, those from Connecticut towns of Mystic, New London, Noank, Stonington, and Waterford.

In 1997 it had 79 students, with 27 students from Connecticut. In 2004 it had 72 students, with almost 24 from Connecticut. In 2011 the school had a total of 65 students, with about 50% living in Connecticut.  In 2019 the school had 30 students from Connecticut. Circa 2021 enrollment is about 70.

In 1997 Cornelius O'Connell, the principal, stated that several parents living off-island specifically liked the middle school curriculum and therefore sent their children to Fishers Island School for grades 6–8.

 secondary classes may have class sizes of two or three students.

Teaching staff
 some teachers commute from Connecticut.

Academic performance
It got high test scores in 1997: its 6th grade reading scores in 1996 had all four students pass - a 100% pass rate. Tom Verde of The New York Times stated that the "low student-teacher ratio[...] and one of the highest per-pupil expenditure rates in the state, [...]contributed to the school's reputation."

Transportation
Out of state students use a ferry to go to and from the school. Some students do their homework on the ferry. Days of high wind can affect ferry operations.

Extracurricular activity
The school has fewer high school organized sports and band activities relative to mainland schools. In 1997 there is a golf team that travels to a country club to practice. Students also take senior trips outside of the United States. The latter two aspects and campus features were ones Verde referred to as being something typical of private schools.

References

External links
 Fishers Island School

Southold, New York
School districts in New York (state)
Education in Suffolk County, New York